Olivier Adam (born 12 July 1974) is a French author and screenwriter. His debut novel Je vais bien, ne t’en fais pas (Don't worry, I am fine) was adapted into the eponym film. He also writes books for young adults, among them La messe anniversaire. Adam won the 2004 Prix Goncourt de la Nouvelle for Passer l'hiver.

He grew up in the Paris suburbs and now lives in Brittany near Saint-Malo. He participated in the creation of the literary festival Correspondence Manosque. Also a screenwriter, he has participated in writing Don't Worry, I'm Fine (2006) and Welcome (2009).

Biography 

Adam was born in 1974 and grew up in Paris with two brothers. He attended Paris Dauphine University, where he met his future partner Karine Reysset.

Works 
2000 : Je vais bien, ne t'en fais pas, Le Dilettante.
2001 : À l'Ouest, Éditions de l'Olivier.
2002 : Poids léger, Éditions de l'Olivier.
2004 : Douanes, nouvelle parue dans le cadre de Lille 2004 Capitale européenne de la culture.
2004 : Passer l'hiver (short stories), Éditions de l'Olivier.
2004 : Sous la pluie, L'École des loisirs.
2005 : Falaises, Éditions de l'Olivier.
2007 : À l'abri de rien, Éditions de l'Olivier.
2009 : Des vents contraires, Éditions de l'Olivier.
2010 : Le Cœur régulier, Éditions de l'Olivier.
2010 : Kyoto Limited Express, avec Arnaud Auzouy, Éditions de l'Olivier.
2012 : Les Lisières, Flammarion
2014 : Peine perdue, Flammarion
2016 : La Renverse, Flammarion

Works for youth
2000 : On ira voir la mer, L'École des loisirs, collection « Médium »
2003 : La Messe anniversaire, L'École des loisirs, collection « Médium »
2004 : Sous la pluie, L'École des loisirs, collection « Médium »
2005 : Comme les doigts de la main, L'École des loisirs, collection « Médium »
2005 : Le jour où j'ai cassé le château de Chambord, L'École des loisirs, collection « Mouche », illustré par Bonniol
2006 : La Cinquième saison, collectif, L'École des loisirs, collection « Médium »
2009 : Ni vu ni connu, L'École des loisirs, collection « Neuf »
2010 : Les Boulzoreilles, with Euriel Dumait, Seuil Jeunesse
2010 : Un océan dans la baignoire, avec Françoiz Breut, Actes Sud Junior
2011 : Personne ne bouge, éditions École des loisirs, collection Neuf
2011 : Achile et la rivière, avec Ilya Green, Actes Sud Junior

Awards 
2004 : Prix Goncourt de la nouvelle for Passer l'hiver.
2006 : Lauréat de la Villa Kujoyama.
2007 : Lauréat du Prix Roman France Télévisions pour À l'abri de rien.
2007 : Prix du roman populiste for À l'abri de rien.
2007 : Prix du Amila Meckert for À l'abri de rien.
2007 : Étoile d'or du scénariste for the film Don't Worry, I'm Fine
2007 : Meilleur scénario au Festival de la fiction TV de La Rochelle pour Maman est folle
2009 : Lauréat du prix RTL-Lire for Des vents contraires
2010 : Prix Jacques Prévert du Scénario for the film Welcome

Screen adaptations 
Poids Léger was adapted into the film Lightweight by Jean-Pierre Améris with Nicolas Duvauchelle and Bernard Campan in the lead roles.

À l'abri de rien was adapted for television (Maman est folle) with Isabelle Carré in the lead role.

Je vais bien, ne t'en fais pas was adapted into the film Don't Worry, I'm Fine directed by Philippe Lioret in 2006. Kad Merad and Mélanie Laurent played the lead roles. The film was nominated for a César in several categories, including Best Adapted Screenplay. Kad Merad won the Cesar for best supporting actor and Mélanie Laurent for Most Promising Actress.

Des vents contraires was adapted into a film of the same name in 2011 starring Audrey Tautou.

The short story Nouvel An from the short story collection Passer l'hiver was adapted into the film Passer l'hiver directed by Aurélia Barbet.

Le Cœur régulier was adapted into a film in 2016 with Vanja d'Alcantara directing and Isabelle Carré starring.

References

External links 

1974 births
Living people
People from Draveil
Writers from Île-de-France
Collège Stanislas de Paris alumni
French children's writers
Postmodern writers
French male screenwriters
21st-century French novelists
French male novelists
Prix Goncourt de la nouvelle recipients
Chevaliers of the Ordre des Arts et des Lettres
21st-century French male writers
21st-century French screenwriters